Eopolita is a genus of gastropods belonging to the family Oxychilidae.

The species of this genus are found in Mediterranean.

Species:

Eopolita derbentina 
Eopolita forcarti 
Eopolita protensa

References

Oxychilidae